Dexter High School may refer to:

Dexter High School (Michigan), Dexter, Michigan
Dexter Regional High School, Dexter, Maine